The 1964 Liberty Bowl was a college football bowl game played on December 19, 1964, at the Atlantic City Convention Hall (now known as Boardwalk Hall) in Atlantic City, New Jersey. It was the sixth edition of the Liberty Bowl, and featured the Utah Redskins and the West Virginia Mountaineers.

This was the first major bowl game ever played indoors and the first indoor American football game broadcast nationwide in the United States.

Background
The venue had been shifted to Atlantic City after the bowl was played for its initial five years outdoors in Philadelphia Municipal Stadium (later John F. Kennedy Stadium), often in temperatures below freezing. The inaugural Liberty Bowl in 1959 saw Penn State beat Alabama by a score of 7–0 in front of 38,000 fans. But it was downhill from there, and fewer than 10,000 were in attendance to watch the 1963 edition between Mississippi State and NC State, with the organizers taking a loss of $40,000. The frigid temperatures at year's end in the Northeast led to the game being called the "Deep Freeze Bowl". Bud Dudley, organizer of the Liberty Bowl, was ready for a change and he was receptive to an offer from a group of Atlantic City businessmen who were trying to help revive the then-fading Jersey Shore resort that included a $25,000 guarantee.

The 1964 playing of the Liberty Bowl was the first major bowl game ever played indoors. Artificial turf was not in use  yet, and the playing surface was a  grass surface with two inches of burlap underneath it on top of concrete. Artificial lights were installed and kept running all day long to keep the grass growing. The organizers spent $16,000 on all of the field preparations for the game. To squeeze the game onto the floor of the convention hall, the end zones at each side of the field were shortened to eight yards in depth from the regulation ten.

In the 1964 postseason, the Liberty Bowl was one of just eight major bowl games. The American Broadcasting Company (ABC) agreed to broadcast the game nationally and brought Paul Christman, Curt Gowdy, and Jim McKay to announce the game, paying $95,000 for the rights to broadcast the first nationwide telecast of an indoor football game.

Game summary

The Utah Redskins (8–2) faced the West Virginia Mountaineers (7–3). West Virginia's regular season record included a 28–27 upset over the Sugar Bowl-bound Syracuse Orangemen in their final regular game of the season. West Virginia featured running back Dick Leftridge and Utah's offense featured All-American Roy Jefferson. Utah used their speed and dominated West Virginia from start to finish and won 32–6. Utah Halfback Ron Coleman gained 154 yards on 15 carries, scoring a touchdown on a 53-yard run. Utah quarterback (and safety) Pokey Allen was named the game's outstanding player.

This was the last edition of the Liberty Bowl played in the Northeastern United States; it moved to Memphis, Tennessee, for the 1965 edition, where it has remained.

Scoring summary

References

Further reading
  (video)
  (video)

Liberty Bowl
Liberty Bowl
Utah Utes football bowl games
West Virginia Mountaineers football bowl games
Sports competitions in Atlantic City, New Jersey
Liberty Bowl
December 1964 sports events in the United States